Beaver River is an unincorporated area in central Alberta, Canada within the Municipal District of Bonnyville No. 87. It is named after the Beaver River that flows from Alberta to Saskatchewan.

See also 
List of communities in Alberta

Localities in the Municipal District of Bonnyville No. 87